Garbiñe Muguruza was the defending champion and successfully defended her title, after Victoria Azarenka retired in the final with a leg injury with the score at 6–1, 3–1.

Seeds

Draw

Finals

Top half

Bottom half

Qualifying

Seeds

Qualifiers

Lucky losers

Draw

First qualifier

Second qualifier

Third qualifier

Fourth qualifier

References

External Links
Main Draw
Qualifying Draw

Monterrey Open - Singles
2019 Singles